Ayampe is a small coastal town located in the canton of Puerto Lopez, in Manabí province, approximately 301 km away from Quito, Ecuador.

Description 
Ayampe is a coastal town with a population size of approximately 400. While originally economically relying on the fishery, the last 2 decades evolved the town into a touristic hotspot. Although the area around Ayampe is not a protected area, it does provide a valuable area for the study around Ecuadorian coastal biodiversity due to its connectivity with the Machalilla National Park. Ayampe is part of the Ecuadorian Ruta del Sol.

References

Populated places in Manabí Province
Beaches of Ecuador
Puerto López Canton